Highway 52, known locally as the Heritage Highway, is a 243 km (151 mi) long alternate loop route between Arras, on the John Hart Highway just west of Dawson Creek, and Tupper, on the B.C.-Alberta boundary, via the community of Tumbler Ridge, 98 km (61 mi) south of Arras and 145 km (90 mi) south of Tupper. The highway to Arras was first given the number 52 in 1988, and the highway to Tupper received the same number in the late 1990s.

In addition to Tumbler Ridge, the Heritage Highway provides access to Bearhole Lake Provincial Park and Protected Area and One Island Lake Provincial Park. 

The highway is mainly chip-seal, except for a 36km section which is gravel.  It has many steep grades and sharp turns.

052